Squirrel Boy is an American animated television series created by Everett Peck for Cartoon Network. Before the show, Peck was known for creating Duckman, which aired on USA Network from 1994 to 1997. The show premiered on May 29, 2006, and ended on September 27, 2007, with a total of 52 eleven-minute episode segments. A series of six shorts were released in 2008 from January 11 to April 10, and aired between commercial breaks as part of the Cartoon Network Extra mini-series. 

Similar to Mike, Lu & Og, the show also has a distinctive animation style that can also be found similar to shows produced by Klasky Csupo, such as Rugrats, Duckman, Aaahh!!! Real Monsters, The Wild Thornberrys, Rocket Power, and As Told by Ginger, due to its crudely drawn look.

The series was Everett Peck's final animated production before he died in June 2022.

Overview

Squirrel Boy centers on the lives of an anthropomorphic squirrel named Rodney (Richard Steven Horvitz), who is full of crazy ideas and get-rich-quick schemes, and his best friend and owner, a boy named Andy Johnson (Pamela Adlon). In the family are Robert (Kurtwood Smith), Andy's pessimistic and unlucky father who utterly dislikes Rodney, and Lucille (Nancy Sullivan), Andy's cheery and mild-tempered mother.

Andy and Rodney are arch-enemies with a rowdy boy named Kyle Finkster (Billy West) and his anthropomorphic parrot, Salty Mike (Carlos Alazraqui), who are neighborhood bullies and constantly pick on Andy and Rodney. Other characters in the show include Oscar (Jason Spisak), Andy's nerdy human friend with overprotective parents, Leon (Tom Kenny), a stray, blue squirrel who is Rodney's friend and lives in a tree in the Johnsons' backyard, Darlene (Monica Lee Gradischek), a yellow, stray squirrel who is Rodney's love interest, Martha (Eliza Schneider), a prodigious, nerdy human girl who lives across the street and is Andy's love interest, and Esther Flatbottom, a cranky old lady who rides a motorized cart.

Episodes

Series overview

Unaired pilot

Season 1 (2006)

Season 2 (2007)

Shorts (2008)

References

External links
 
 

2000s American animated television series
2000s American children's comedy television series
2006 American television series debuts
2007 American television series endings
American children's animated comedy television series
Animated television series about children
Animated television series about squirrels
Cartoon Network original programming
Television series by Cartoon Network Studios
Television series created by Everett Peck
English-language television shows
Fictional squirrels